George Findley Willison (1896–1972) was a writer and editor who specialized in American history.  He also worked in education, journalism, art, public relations, and the military.

He was born in Colorado and lived much of his life in New York. Notable among his books is Saints and Strangers, about the lives of the Mayflower Pilgrims. He also wrote Cliffs Notes for the books Pilgrim's Progress and The Federalist, and contributed to the History of Pittsfield, MA.

Books
 Here They Dug The Gold (1931, rev. 1945)
 Why Wars are Declared (1936)
 Saints and Strangers (1945)
 ''Behold Virginia: the fifth crown. Being the trials, adventures & disasters of the first families of Virginia, the rise of the grandees & the eventual triumph of the common & uncommon sort in the Revolution (1951)
 I Am an American - Patrick Henry and His World (1969)
 The Pilgrim Reader (1953)

References

External links 

 George and Toni Willison papers, at the University of Maryland libraries

1896 births
1972 deaths
20th-century American historians
American male non-fiction writers
Historians of Puritanism
20th-century American male writers